This is the list of school districts in Arkansas.

Background 
The proposed school consolidation came as a result of education reform measures spearheaded by the Arkansas Education Association (AEA), which was prompted by a 1921 study done by the Arkansas Legislature that criticized conditions at various public schools.

In the 1926-1927 school year, Arkansas had 4,711 school districts, with 3,106 of them each operating a school for white students that only employed a single teacher. Various laws affecting taxation and state and county governance reduced the number of school districts, including a 1927 law that allowed counties, upon voter approval, to modify boundaries of existing school districts or to create new school districts, Act 156, and a 1929 law that allowed voters in a county to vote in favor of consolidating multiple school districts into one, Act 149. However in 1931 a law was passed stating that in order for a school district to consolidate, the voters in each district must approve.

In the 1932-1933 school year, Arkansas had 3,086 school districts, with 1,990 of them each operating a school for white students that only employed a single teacher. Calvin R. Ledbetter Jr. of the University of Arkansas at Little Rock stated that the Great Depression caused a drop in government revenues and frustrated school consolidation.

In 1946 there were 1,900 school districts educating 406,199 students, with a typical county having an average of 25 school districts. That year 76,000 students lived in a district which had a high school that had not been accredited since there were insufficient students, and about 100,000 students lived in districts that did not operate high schools. Ledbetter stated that about 40% of the K-12 students in Arkansas were realistically not able to go beyond junior high school. That year there was a petition for an Act 1 which would have forced school districts with under 350 students to form "county rural school districts", created as a result of a lack of teachers due to several being drafted into the military, moving out of state, or moving on to defense jobs during World War II. This proposal would mean Arkansas would have about 400 school districts. The two newspapers distributed throughout the entire state of Arkansas supported this. However newspapers did not print advertisements supporting the passage of the act nor did they print the opposite. At the time people advocating for or against political causes bought space to print advertisements for them in newspapers. Voters rejected this with 68,510 opposing (50.47%), with the Arkansas Democrat stating that they were heavily in smaller counties and especially in the state's north, and with 67,209 (49.52%) supporting, credited by the Democrat as being heavily in larger counties. Ledbetter characterized the voting margin as "a fraction".

In 1948 over 60% of Arkansas voters passed Act 1, which was to force any school district with under 300 students to consolidate. No lawsuits resulted from the passage. There were no advertisements supporting the referendum in newspapers, nor any against. Governor of Arkansas Benjamin Travis Laney stated opposition without stating his reasoning. It was favored by Sid McMath, who became the Democratic Party candidate for governor. The two major statewide newspapers also supported this act. Some rural voters were afraid their children would have too long of a commute to school and therefore opposed it.

From 1948 to 1949, the number of school districts fell from 1,600 to 423, and in 1964 this was down to 412. In 1966 there was a referendum to require school districts with under 400 students to consolidate. The Arkansas Gazette supported the measure but Governor of Arkansas Orval Faubus stated opposition to it. Additionally Winthrop Rockefeller and Jim Johnson, two candidates for the 1966 election of the governor of Arkansas, also stated opposition. 321,733 people voted against it, making up 73.59%. 115,452 people voted for it, making up 26.41%. Ledbetter characterized the result as "a landslide".

There were 370 school districts in 1983. After the Arkansas State Board of Education created rules for the minimum level of standards a school district must provide in its educational program that year, the number of school districts declined further, with there being 311 in 1996, and then, as of 1998, 310.

Since 2003, two major components in Arkansas public school districts must exist:
 Each school district must have a high school, and
 Each school district must have 350 students.

The current consolidation policy that mandates operational changes for all districts with fewer than 350 students is the Public Education Reorganization Act—Act 60 of the Second Extraordinary Session of 2003.

Geographical school districts in Arkansas are generally independent from city or county jurisdiction.

Arkansas school district boundaries are not always aligned with county or city boundaries; a district can occupy several counties and cities, while a single city (especially larger ones such as Little Rock, Fort Smith, or Jonesboro) may be split between several districts. Almost all Arkansas school districts use the title "School District", or "Public Schools".

All districts come under the jurisdiction of the Arkansas Department of Education (ADE).  Extracurricular activities come under the jurisdiction of the Arkansas Activities Association.

In 1996 the average Arkansas school district had 1,468 students.

Alphabetical Listing by Co-op and County

Arch Ford Educational Service

Cleburne County

 Heber Springs School District
 Quitman School District
 West Side School District

Conway County

 Nemo Vista School District
 South Conway County School District
 Wonderview School District

Faulkner County

Conway School District
Greenbrier School District
Guy–Perkins School District
Mayflower School District
 Mount Vernon–Enola School District
 Vilonia School District

Perry County

East End School District
 Perryville School District

Pope County

 Atkins School District
Dover School District
 Hector School District
 Pottsville School District
 Russellville School District

Van Buren County

Clinton School District
 Shirley School District
 South Side School District

Yell County

Danville School District
Dardanelle Public Schools
 Two Rivers School District
 Western Yell County School District

Arkansas River Educational Service Center

Arkansas County
 Stuttgart Public Schools

Grant County
 Sheridan School District

Jefferson County

 Pine Bluff School District
 Watson Chapel School District
 White Hall School District

Crowley's Ridge Education Co-op

Craighead County

 Bay School District
 Brookland School District
 Buffalo Island Central School District
Jonesboro School District
 Nettleton School District
 Riverside School District
 Valley View School District

Crittenden County

Earle School District
Marion School District

Cross County

Cross County School District
 Wynne School District

Jackson County
 Newport School District

Mississippi County

 Armorel School District
 Blytheville School District
Gosnell School District
Manila School District
 Osceola School District
 Rivercrest School District

Poinsett County

East Poinsett County School District
 Harrisburg School District
Marked Tree School District
 Trumann Public Schools

Dawson Education Service Co-op

Clark County

 Arkadelphia School District
Gurdon School District

Garland County

Cutter–Morning Star School District
Fountain Lake School District
 Hot Springs School District
Jessieville School District
 Lake Hamilton School District
 Lakeside School District
Mountain Pine School District

Grant County
 Poyen School District

Hot Spring County

 Bismarck School District
Glen Rose School District
Magnet Cove School District
Malvern School District
 Ouachita School District

Pike County

Centerpoint School District
 Kirby School District
 South Pike County School District

Saline County

 Bauxite School District
 Benton School District
 Bryant School District
 Harmony Grove School District

DeQueen/Mena Education Co-op

Howard County

Dierks School District
Mineral Springs Saratoga School District
 Nashville School District

Little River County

 Ashdown School District
Foreman School District

Montgomery County

Caddo Hills School District
Mount Ida School District

Polk County

 Cossatot River School District
Mena School District
 Ouachita River School District

Sevier County

DeQueen School District
 Horatio School District

Great Rivers Education Service Co-op

Crittenden County
 West Memphis School District

Lee County
 Lee County School District

Monroe County

 Brinkley School District
Clarendon School District

Phillips County

 Barton–Lexa School District
 Helena-West Helena School District
 KIPP: Delta Public Schools
Marvell–Elaine School District

St. Francis County

Forrest City School District
 Palestine–Wheatley School District

Guy Fenter Education Service Cooperative

Crawford County

 Alma School District
Cedarville School District
Mountainburg School District
 Mulberry–Pleasant View Bi-County School District
 Van Buren School District

Franklin County

Charleston School District
County Line School District
 Ozark School District

Johnson County

Clarksville School District
 Lamar School District
 Westside School District

Logan County

 Booneville School District
Magazine School District
 Paris School District
 Scranton School District

Scott County
 Waldron School District

Sebastian County

Fort Smith School District
Greenwood School District
 Hackett School District
 Lavaca School District
Mansfield School District

North Central Arkansas Education Co-op

Baxter County

Mountain Home School District
 Norfork School District

Cleburne County
Concord School District

Fulton County

Mammoth Spring School District
 Salem School District
 Viola School District

Independence County

 Batesville School District
Cedar Ridge School District
Midland School District
 Southside School District

Izard County

Calico Rock School District
Izard County Consolidated School District
Melbourne School District

Sharp County

Cave City School District
 Highland School District

Stone County
Mountain View School District

Northeast Arkansas Education Co-op

Clay County

Corning School District
 Piggott School District
 Rector School District

Craighead County
 Westside Consolidated School District

Greene County

Greene County Tech School District
Marmaduke School District
 Paragould School District

Jackson County
Jackson County School District

Lawrence County

 Hillcrest School District
 Hoxie School District
Imboden Charter School District 
 Lawrence County School District
 Sloan–Hendrix School District

Randolph County

Maynard School District
 Pocahontas School District

Northwest Arkansas Education Co-op

Benton County

 Bentonville School District
Decatur Public Schools
Gentry School District
Gravette School District
 Pea Ridge School District
 Rogers School District
 Siloam Springs School District

Madison County
 Huntsville School District

Washington County

Elkins School District
Farmington School District
Fayetteville School District
Greenland School District
 Lincoln School District
 Prairie Grove School District
 Springdale School District
 West Fork School District

Ozark Unlimited Resource Co-op

Baxter County
Cotter School District

Boone County

 Alpena School District
 Bergman School District
 Harrison School District
 Lead Hill School District
 Omaha School District
 Valley Springs School District

Carroll County

 Berryville School District
Eureka Springs School District
Green Forest School District

Marion County

Flippin School District
 Yellville–Summit School District

Newton County

Deer/Mount Judea School District
Jasper School District

Searcy County

 Ozark Mountain School District
 Searcy County School District

Pulaski County Schools

Pulaski County

 Jacksonville North Pulaski School District
 Little Rock School District
 North Little Rock School District
 Pulaski County Special School District

South Central Service Co-op

Calhoun County
 Hampton School District

Columbia County

Emerson-Taylor-Bradley School District
Magnolia School District

Ouachita County

 Bearden School District
 Camden Fairview School District
 Harmony Grove School District

Union County

El Dorado School District
Junction City School District
 Parkers Chapel School District
 Smackover School District
 Strong–Huttig School District

Southeast Arkansas Educational

Arkansas County
Dewitt School District

Ashley County

Crossett School District
 Hamburg School District

Bradley County

 Hermitage School District
 Warren School District

Chicot County

Dermott School District
 Lakeside School District

Cleveland County

Cleveland County School District
 Woodlawn School District

Dallas County
Fordyce School District

Desha County

Dumas School District
McGehee School District

Drew County

Drew Central School District
Monticello School District

Lincoln County
 Star City School District

Southwest Arkansas Co-op

Hempstead County

 Blevins School District
 Hope School District
 Spring Hill School District

Lafayette County
 Lafayette County School District

Miller County

Fouke School District
Genoa Central School District
 Texarkana Arkansas Schools

Nevada County

 Nevada School District
 Prescott School District

Wilbur D. Mills Education Co-op

Lonoke County

Cabot School District
Carlisle School District
England School District
 Lonoke School District

Prairie County

Des Arc School District
 Hazen School District

White County

 Bald Knob School District
 Beebe School District
 Bradford School District
 Pangburn School District
 Riverview School District
 Rose Bud School District
 Searcy School District
 White County Central School District

Woodruff County

 Augusta School District
McCrory School District

See also

 List of high schools in Arkansas

References

Reference notes

Further reading
  - Working paper (authors state "Please Do Not Cite without Author Permission")

External links
Public School Districts in Arkansas

Arkansas
School districts
School districts